William Frederick "Bill" Crothers (born December 24, 1940) is a Canadian retired athlete.

Born in Markham, Crothers grew up in the Toronto suburbs of East York and Agincourt, attending high school at Agincourt Collegiate Institute before going on to study at the University of Toronto.

At one point, Crothers held the Canadian record in all distances from 400 metres to 1500 metres and was holder of the world 800 metres indoor record. In 1963, he ran the two fastest 800 metres races of the year. He was named Lou Marsh Trophy winner as Canada's top athlete of 1963. Crothers competed for Canada in the 1964 Summer Olympics held in Tokyo, winning a silver medal in the 800 metres. He also competed in the 400 metres, but was eliminated in the semi-finals. He received the Lionel Conacher Award as Canada's top male athlete of 1964. Crothers was ranked by Track & Field News as the top 800 metres runner of 1965 and the second best of the decade.

He has been inducted into the Canadian Olympic Hall of Fame (1965), the Canada's Sports Hall of Fame (1971), and the Ontario Sports Hall of Fame (1997).

Crothers was a pharmacist (Kiernan-Crothers Pharmacy) in the Markham area for many years, and was a trustee (and past board chair) for the York Region District School Board. Bill Crothers Secondary School, an athletic-focused secondary school in York Region opened in his honour in August 2008.

References

External links
 
 
 
 
 

1940 births
Living people
Athletes (track and field) at the 1962 British Empire and Commonwealth Games
Athletes (track and field) at the 1964 Summer Olympics
Athletes (track and field) at the 1966 British Empire and Commonwealth Games
Athletes (track and field) at the 1967 Pan American Games
Athletes (track and field) at the 1968 Summer Olympics
Canadian male middle-distance runners
Lou Marsh Trophy winners
Olympic silver medalists for Canada
Olympic track and field athletes of Canada
Sportspeople from Markham, Ontario
Track and field athletes from Ontario
Ontario school board trustees
Commonwealth Games medallists in athletics
Medalists at the 1964 Summer Olympics
Olympic silver medalists in athletics (track and field)
Commonwealth Games silver medallists for Canada
Pan American Games medalists in athletics (track and field)
Pan American Games silver medalists for Canada
Universiade medalists in athletics (track and field)
Universiade gold medalists for Canada
Medalists at the 1965 Summer Universiade
Medalists at the 1967 Pan American Games
Medallists at the 1966 British Empire and Commonwealth Games